The former Fourth Church of Christ, Scientist, located at 3101 West 31st Avenue, in Denver, Colorado, is a historic structure that on April 21, 2004, was added to the National Register of Historic Places.

National register listing
Fourth Church of Christ, Scientist (added 2004 - Building - #04000336)
Now occupied by The Sanctuary
3101 W. 31st Ave., Denver
Historic Significance: 	Architecture/Engineering
Architect, builder, or engineer: 	Hoyt, Merrill H., Hoyt, Burnham F.
Architectural Style: 	Renaissance
Area of Significance: 	Architecture
Period of Significance: 	1900-1924
Owner: 	Private
Historic Function: 	Religion
Historic Sub-function: 	Religious Structure
Current Function: 	Religion
Current Sub-function: 	Religious Structure

See also
List of Registered Historic Places in Denver County, Colorado
List of former Christian Science churches, societies and buildings
 Fourth Church of Christ, Scientist (disambiguation)

References

External links

Churches on the National Register of Historic Places in Colorado
Churches in Denver
Christian Science churches in Colorado
Former Christian Science churches, societies and buildings in the United States
National Register of Historic Places in Denver

zh:基督教科学派第四教会 (丹佛)